Nocardioides luteus is a bacterium from the genus Nocardioides which has been isolated from soil in Khartoum, Sudan. The C-10 Deacetylase from Nocardioides luteus can be used for enzymatic hydrolysis for producing 10-Deacetyl Baccatin III.

References

Further reading

External links
Type strain of Nocardioides luteus at BacDive -  the Bacterial Diversity Metadatabase	

luteus
Bacteria described in 1985